This is a list of the number-one hits of 1960 on Italian Hit Parade Singles Chart.

See also
1960 in music
List of number-one hits in Italy

References

1960 in Italian music
1960 record charts
1960